Coronel Moldes (Salta) is a town and municipality in Salta Province in northwestern Argentina.

Climate

References

Populated places in Salta Province